Nimbhore Budruk is a census town in Jalgaon district in the Indian state of Maharashtra.

Demographics
 India census, Nimbhore Budruk had a population of 8449. Males constitute 53% of the population and females 47%. Nimbhore Budruk has an average literacy rate of 83%, higher than the national average of 59.5%: male literacy is 87%, and female literacy is 78%. In Nimbhore Budruk, 9% of the population is under 6 years of age.

References

Cities and towns in Jalgaon district